OFC Russel Gabčíkovo was a Slovak football team, based in the town of Gabčíkovo. The club was founded in 1923. In February 2013, the club was renamed OFK Russel Gabčíkovo, due to the club's new sponsor.

In 2016, the club was dissolved due to financial problems.

History

If we take just football as the basis of organized sports, its origins date back over seventy-two years. However, if we seek the origins of folk games based on active movement, we have a very difficult time finding their first roots.

How did it actually start with football? Easily: in green- and blue-white. It is explained very clearly by the book titled 70 Years of Sports in Gabčíkovo – 1923–1993, according to which right after World War I French Legionnaires had been accommodated in the Castle Amade, who used to play football in the park of the castle. The bystander local youth liked this game very much. However, there was a problem: the villagers had no ball.

Meanwhile, they learned that the French soldiers adored cat meat and, consequently, the population of cats became soon “thinned” in Gabčikovo. The villagers sold male and female cats to Legionnaires and bought a real soccer ball.

Let’s suppose that indeed in 1923 football in Gabčikovo started its “journey of conquest”. However, in that case something is wrong, there is something contradictory in the memories of Imrich Vida and Michal Kovács: “The interest was great, and after all, we urged the youth to play, too!” The idea of founding our own team came up immediately; however, some basic statutes would have been necessary for that, but we did not have available anything like that. Fortunately, the local Roman Catholic Reverend – priest Rezső Bohus also supported us, even joined us... Concerning the previous quote, just two comments: Rezső Bohus was appointed to the post of parish priest of the village of Gabčíkovo only in July 1929, so he could join the football team at the most in the summer of 1930! On the other hand, the basis Statute of BSK – i.e. the Sports Club of Gabčíkovo already existed in 1927!

The football team of Gabčíkovo was in 1927 officially renamed as Gabčíkovský Športový Klub – BSK (BSK is the abbreviation of the Hungarian version of the club’s title). BSK then played matches in green and white colors; players had a set of sports uniforms and two footballs. František Bartalos recorded the statutes of the club. Leadership positions were given to the former athlete from Budapest, Ľudovít Pék and a local player, Štefan Komáromi. The backbone of the team was constituted by: František Pavlovics, Vojtech Bartal, Vojtech Kovács, Jozef Bartal, Jozef Pavlovics, František Vass, Jozef Horváth, and Imrich Vida, just like František Sveiger, Rezső Koczkás, Ladislav Bodó, Eugen Bodó and Štefan Horváth. The team of this club even won a Winning Cup in 1928 against other teams from the surrounding villages.

During the years 1938–1945 Gabčíkovo was again attached to Hungary, and the football players of the Sports Club of Gabčíkovo had been included into the County Youth League of Győr* in the context of football championships (*this included youth, who, depending on their age were classified into the organization for compulsory pre-military training of youth that existed in the years from 1921 to 1944 only in the former Hungary – comment of the translator). Arpád Knap and Michal Viola, who were coaches, prepared the following athletes from Gabčíkovo for football: Ladislav Mózes, František Sveiger, Eugen Both, Ignác Jakus, Tibor Csörgő, Michal Varga, Július Nagy, Ladislav Derzsi, Imrich Both, Ján Gróf, Ľudovít Tóth, Ľudovít Rákóczi, Eugen Raj and František Raj – who actually formed the framework of the football team.

After World War II, in 1947, properly organized football "kicked off". At its “cradle” stood Arpád Gróf, Aurel Heizer, Eugen Both, Ján Gróf, Alfred Bellus, Arpád Nagy and others who have contributed to the football playing of the team of Gabčíkovo by their help – at the district championship organized in Dunajská Streda. For a long time, the footballers of Čalovo (today Veľký Meder – comment of the translator) and Dunajská Streda have undermined the possibility of footballers from Gabčíkovo stepping higher. Finally in 1958 Gabčíkovo won the championship in the district and stepped forward to the regional championship, where the footballers of Gabčíkovo had remained until 1961. It was in that year when the team fell back to the level of district championships in which the team of Gabčíkovo played football matches between the years of 1961 and 1968 under the name of “Družstevník” (“Cooperator”), despite the fact that this their “godfather” was unable to support them...

In 1968, the creation of the team of an "innovative spirit” began. From the framework, which was constituted by: Ivan Frivalszky, Peter Frivalszky, Štefan Varga, Matej Derzsi, Štefan Both, Alfred Csiba, Imrich Csiba, Vojtech Gúgh, Ivan Palkovics, Florián Kozmér, Ladislav Patasi, Ondrej Rákóczi, Jozef Nagy, Štefan Mészáros, Mikuláš Bodó, Alfred Szabó, Gašpar Derzsi, Ján Ondrášek (four-time Czechoslovak national team), Peter Derzsi, Pavol Derzsi, Ladislav Sidó, Ľudovít Mészáros and František Heiszer – coach František Kuczmann prepared such a squad, which in 1976 won the title of district champion! Gabčíkovo moved to the county I. B league.

In 1978 the team was reorganized again. The squad consisted of the following players: A. Lukács, L. Nagy, Magyarics, Gy. Horváth, Sebő, Patasi, Sipos, Gaura, Halász, Balogh, and Žiak, and was led by coach Alexander Brányik into district class A. In the context of the football cup, this squad even “fought itself” into the circle of the sixteen best club teams in Slovakia.

Within the framework of championships, in the years 1979–1980 Gabčíkovo “ended” at 13th place; however, already in the season after – to the delight of its fans – it got up on the podium. The bronze group consisted at the time of its new coach, Bertalan Sipos and the following players: Mészáros, Botló, Farkas, Fodor, Izsmán, Lépes, Derzsi, Sebő, Malinovszky, Onódy, Csánó, Škabla, Štropka, Diószegi, Nagy, and Gábriš. Subsequently, first this football team from Gabčíkovo ranked itself at 4th place, and in the championship of 1982–83 it ranked itself at 5th place; however, under a new name, the “Telovýchovná Jednota Štátneho Majetku Gabčíkovo” (“Physical Education Union of the State Property of Gabčíkovo”), i.e. TJ SM Gabčíkovo.

In the meantime, the national economy started to sponsor this club with its “protective wings”, and the club started to succeed increasingly under the leadership of its director, coming from Baky. In the ranks of the team some changes were made and thus in 1989 it won the championship in class I. A. Two years later the team got into the so-called “western” team of class II of the Slovak National League. In 1991 the team remained in its class, although “on shaky legs”, but in 1993 it strengthened itself again and won another championship!

Members of the championship team were: Sergei Prikhodko and Attila Jankovics – goalkeepers, defenders were: Barnabáš Kováts, František Tóth (team captain), Jozef Medgyes, František Csiffári, Dezider Varga, Milan Škoda and Genadij Salov; deep-lying playmakers were: Tihamér Varga, Jozef Ravasz, Tibor Domonkos, Zoltán Mészáros, Peter Molnár and Ferdinand Szabó; and the forwards were: Zsolt Győri, Tibor Szabó and Gabriel Johancsik who attacked the opponents' goal.

The education of adolescents means continuous renewal and refreshment of football in Gabčíkovo. The young football players have been systematically dealt with since 1948. In 1976 the youth football team of Gabčíkovo achieved the title District Champion, and afterwards, in 1977 it achieved the title of a Champion in class I.B and it got to the class I.A, where the team of players, consisting of the following players: Darnay, Izsmán, Á. Mészáros, Jandura, Szeif, Both, Katona, Vida, R. Nagy, R. Mészáros, Kántor and Vörös was led by the following coaches: Alfréd Fekete and Žigmund Végh with the relevant knowledge and experience.

In 1993 the club celebrated its 70th anniversary – thanks to the sponsorship of the state property of Gabčíkovo – not only with the championship team of seniors but also with that of the youth! The goal difference they achieved could be recorded into the book of records: 136:23! The framework of the junior championship team consisted of the following players: Arnold Schweiger and Tibor Csonka – goalkeepers, Robert Szekács, Matej Jakus, Robert Ollé, Arpád Mészáros and Ladislav Derzsi – defenders, Imrich Gróf, Kornel Csicsay, Imrich Harsányi, Adrian Zsákovics, Koloman Strbka and Štefan Kovács – midfield players, and Norbert Both, Imrich Puskás, Szilárd Fekete, Ladislav Fenes and Marian Csölle – forwards. Their coach was Jozef Horváth, his assistant was Štefan Bodó and the team captain was Ing. Juraj Sóki.

Notable managers
  Marián Süttö (−2013)
  Tibor Szaban (2013)
  Ľubomír Luhový (2013–2015)
  Mikuláš Radványi (2015)
  Jozef Olejník (2015–2016)

References

External links
Official website 

Defunct football clubs in Slovakia
Association football clubs established in 1923
Association football clubs disestablished in 2016
1923 establishments in Slovakia